Monument Bineothan is the first studio release by Norwegian metalcore/mathcore band Benea Reach.  It was released in Europe in July 2006 on Tabu Records. It was released in the U.S. on 20 March 2007 through Candlelight Records. The album was nominated for the 35th annual Spellemannprisen in the Metal category.

Music Videos were recorded for the songs "Inheritor" and "Pandemonium".

Style 
The album features a technical and experimental style of extreme metal which contains a diverse blend of metalcore, mathcore, death metal, sludge metal, black metal, doom metal, alternative metal, and avant-garde, and drew comparisons to The Dillinger Escape Plan, Meshuggah, Mastodon, and Tool.

Track listing 
All music written and lyrics written by Benea Reach.

 "Ground Slayer" – 6:56
 "Inheritor" – 3:25
 "Transmitter" – 5:24
 "Purge" – 5:06
 "Pandemonium" – 4:30
 "River" – 3:53
 "Torch" – 4:42
 "Conflux" – 3:56
 "Emperor" – 5:59
 "Immaculate" – 6:10
 "Venerate" – 12:18
 "Drapery" – 4:47

Credits 
Benea Reach
 Ilkka Volume – Vocals and Lyrics
 Christer Espevoll – Guitars, Lyrics, and Backing Vocals on "Inheritor"
 Hakon Sagen – Guitars
 Martin Sivertsen – Guitars
 Hakon Nakken – Bass guitar
 Marco Storm – Drums, Synthesizer, Lyrics, Piano, Bass guitar, Production, Album Art and Layout

Other personnel
 Peter Espevoll of Extol – Backing Vocals on "Inheritor" and Chorus Background Vocals on "Emperor"
 Ole Halvard Sveen of Extol, Lengsel, and Mantric – Backing Vocals on "Inheritor" and Chorus Background Vocals on "Emperor"
 Betty Brunick – Voice on "Conflux"
 Remi Christiansen – Pedal Steel Guitar on "Drapery"
 Rolf Yngve Uggen – Co-production
 Johnny Skalleberg – Audio Engineering and Audio Mixing
 Espen Høydalsvik – Audio Engineering and Audio Mixing
 Tonje Storm – Cover photo

Notes 
 The CD booklet was original printed with the wrong pantone color.
 There is not one specific lyricist for the band. Six of the songs' lyrics were provided by Marco Storm. Four of the songs' lyrics were provided by Ilkka Volume. One of the song's lyrics were provided by Christer Espevoll.

References 

2006 albums
Benea Reach albums